Anton Andreyevich Lyuboslavskiy (born 26 June 1984, in Irkutsk) is a Russian shot putter.

His personal best is 20.77 metres, achieved in August 2007 in Tula.

International competitions

References

 
 

1984 births
Living people
Sportspeople from Irkutsk
Russian male shot putters
Olympic male shot putters
Olympic athletes of Russia
Athletes (track and field) at the 2008 Summer Olympics
Universiade medalists in athletics (track and field)
Universiade bronze medalists for Russia
Medalists at the 2005 Summer Universiade
World Athletics Championships athletes for Russia
Russian Athletics Championships winners
21st-century Russian people